Royal Air Force Ansty or RAF Ansty is a former Royal Air Force station located  east of Coventry city centre, Warwickshire, England,  north-west of Rugby, Warwickshire. The airfield was opened in 1936 and after training many pupils closed in 1953.

Station history

The airfield was mainly used for schools with taught navigation and flying to new recruits using a varied range of aircraft such as de Havilland Tiger Moths and Avro Ansons. The first school teaching navigation to arrive was No. 4 Civilian Air Navigation School RAF with the Anson between September 1938 and October 1939 before being renamed No. 4 Air Observer Navigation School RAF (AONS) using Blackburn Bothas as an additional aircraft type between September 1939 and July 1940 before moving to another airfield.

The other schools were used for flying training with the first school arriving on 6 January 1936 which was the No. 9 Elementary and Reserve Flying Training School RAF which flew Ansons, Hawker Harts, Hawker Hinds, Tiger Moths and Clouds until 3 September 1939. The school was operated by Air Services Training at RAF Hamble, under contract from the Air Ministry. The school was renamed the No. 9 Elementary Flying Training School RAF on 3 September 1939 days after the Second World War broke out. The school used Moths until 31 March 1944 which provided initial assessment before pupil pilots were sent abroad in the British Commonwealth Air Training Plan which was operated by Air Service Training.

One of the pilots who received his initial training at Ansty was Jack Currie, who, many years after the war, wrote a successful series of books about his air force experiences. After Ansty, Currie's subsequent training was in the United States.

A number of maintenance units used the site for a small amount of time like when a sub site of No. 27 Maintenance Unit RAF joined in October 1940 and No. 48 MU which used the airfield for temporary dispersal between 1940 and February 1941. After the Second World War the airfield hosted No. 2 Basic Flying Training School RAF from 21 March 1951 until 31 March 1953.

The Coventry Blitz
The first bombs of the war dropped in the vicinity of Coventry were when five dropped on RAF Ansty on 25 June 1940. There were no casualties. This was two days before any civilians were killed near Coventry, when the Hillfields area was bombed and 16 people died.

Accidents and incidents
During life as a RAF training base accidents were not far away with a number of airmen killed during training.

Current use

Rolls-Royce currently occupies the majority of the site as an engine overhaul and repair facility. The company won a contract overhauling the EJ2000 engine, which is used in the Eurofighter Typhoon with some of the work being performed at Ansty, which will also help to keep 3,000 jobs for the company throughout the country.

The northern side has been turned into a business park called Ansty Park, companies on the site include AVL, MTC, Sainsburys, London Taxi Company, HTRC and Fanuc Robotics.

References

External links
 Historic Coventry – Blitz
 Scottish Saltire Aircrew Association – Combatting Stress – Then and Now
 BBC History WW2 People's War – Henry Kaye, Flying Instructor by Ron Goldstein
 213 Squadron Association – Second World War 1937 – 1945
 Rugby Counical – Planning Portal – Ansty Park
 BBC History – Flt. Lieut. John Anderson – Who knows what the future holds?
William Budd’s time in the RAF

Defunct airports in England
Royal Air Force stations in Warwickshire
Royal Air Force stations of World War II in the United Kingdom